Służewiec Południowy is a residential neighbourhood of the city of Warsaw, Poland, located within the district of Mokotów, within the Municipal Information System area (neighbourhood) of Służew. Within its eastern portion is located the neighbourhood of Służewiec-Prototypy.

Its boundaries are made by Marynarska Street to the north west, Lotników Street to the north east, Puławska Street to the east, Bokserska and Wyścigowa Streets to the south, and Puławska Street to the west.

History 
The neighbourhood of Służewiec Południowy had been created on 28 June 2001. Within its eastern portion is located the neighbourhood of Służewiec-Prototypy, a residential neighborhood originally constructed in the 1960s, in the modernism style with the usage of the large panel system-building technology.

Notes

References 

Neighbourhoods of Mokotów
2001 establishments in Poland
Populated places established in 2001